Marvin Jay Greenberg (December 22, 1935 – December 12, 2017) was an American mathematician.

Education 
Greenberg studied at Columbia University where he received his bachelor's degree in 1955 (he was a Ford Scholar as an undergraduate) and received his doctorate 1959 from Princeton University under Serge Lang with the thesis Pro-Algebraic Structure on the Rational Subgroup of a P-Adic Abelian Variety.

Career 
From 1955 Greenberg was an assistant at Princeton, from 1958 an assistant at the University of Chicago and in 1958 and 1959, an instructor at Rutgers University. From 1959 to 1964 he was an assistant professor at the University of California, Berkeley, two years of which time he spent on National Science Foundation postdoctoral fellowships at Harvard University and the Institut des Hautes Études Scientifiques in Paris.

From 1965 to 1967 he was an associate professor at Northeastern University and from 1967 he worked as an associate professor, and later full professor, at the University of California, Santa Cruz. He retired early in 1992 and moved back to Berkeley.

He was known for his books on non-Euclidean geometry and algebraic topology.

Greenberg was also a passionate golfer and a founding member of the Shivas Irons Society.

References

External links 
 Marvin Greenberg's faculty page at the University of California, Santa Cruz

1935 births
2017 deaths
Mathematicians from New York (state)
Princeton University alumni
University of California, Santa Cruz faculty
Columbia University alumni
Northeastern University faculty
Scientists from New York City
Topologists
University of Chicago faculty
Rutgers University faculty
University of California, Berkeley College of Letters and Science faculty
20th-century American mathematicians
French–English translators
21st-century American mathematicians
20th-century American translators